The St. Tropez Belt is a belt made of curved flattened metal links, popular in France as a fashion accessory in the 1960s.

The first St. Tropez belts were produced by members of a French commune and brought to the open market by Jayne Berrier and Claude Jean-Pierre LaCoudre. After a short time, the belts became an indispensable fashion item and were being bought and sold for very high prices. When members of the commune learned of this, they flooded the market with low-priced belts. Within a short time the belt's ubiquitousness and low price led to the wane of its popularity.

See also
Fashion accessory
History of Western fashion
1960s in fashion

External links
Types Of Belt Buckle

French fashion
Belts (clothing)
1960s in France
1960s fashion
French Riviera